Football Heroes of the Block is a 2022 Spanish comedy film directed by Ángeles Reiné which stars Antonio Pagudo and Luna Fulgencio alongside Lisi Linder, Antonio Dechent, Álex O'Dogherty, and Jesús Olmedo.

Plot 
Set in a suburb of Seville, the plot follows a man at a low ebb (Luis), who (falsely) told to be a friend of famous footballer Joaquín to his daughter Paula, a 9-year-old wannabe footballer. Upon lying to Paula, Luis does everything he can not to let her down. Meanwhile Luis yearns to be back with former partner Carmen, Paula's mom. Luis is supported by his father (a former boxer) and friend Litos to win Carmen's love back.

Cast

Production 
The screenplay was penned by Antonio Prieto and Ángeles Reiné. The film was produced by Spal Films, Álamo Producciones and Galdo Media, alongside AIE Palacios Gador, with the collaboration of ICAA, Junta de Andalucía, and Canal Sur. Filming started in March 2021 in Alcalá de Guadaíra.

Release 
The film screened on 25 March 2022 at the 25th Málaga Film Festival. Distributed by A Contracorriente, it was theatrically released in Spain on 29 July 2022.

Reception 
Raquel Hernández Luján of HobbyConsolas scored 50 points ("so-so"), deeming Héroes de barrio to be a "rather predictable and unambitious" film overall.

Oti Rodríguez Marchante of ABC rated the film 2 out of 5 stars, deeming it to be a "well-intentioned comedy", "in the sense that its greatest aim is not to ruin the day of even one of the viewers who come to see it".

Carlos Marañón of Cinemanía rated the film 2½ out of 5 stars, deeming it to be a "simple but honest film, with shortcomings" (...) "but with sparkle".

Accolades 

|-
| rowspan = "3" align = "center" | 2023 || rowspan = "3" | 2nd Carmen Awards || Best Actress || Lisi Linder ||  || rowspan = "3" | 
|-
| Best Art Direction || Lala Obrero || 
|-
| Best Cinematography || Alberto Pareja || 
|}

See also 
 List of Spanish films of 2022

References 

Films shot in the province of Seville
2022 comedy films
Spanish comedy films
2020s Spanish films
2020s Spanish-language films
Films set in Andalusia
Films about father–daughter relationships